Academy at Dundee Ranch was a behavior modification facility for United States teenagers, located on La Ceiba Cascajal,  west of Orotina, province of Alajuela, Costa Rica. It was promoted as a residential school, offering a program of behavior modification, motivational "emotional growth seminars," a progressive academic curriculum, and a structured daily schedule, for teenagers struggling in their homes, schools, or communities.

The facility was associated with World Wide Association of Specialty Programs and Schools (WWASP).

In May 2003, authorities in Costa Rica shut down due to claims of child abuse, and investigated the school and its managers.  A new WWASP facility called Pillars of Hope was opened at the site of Academy at Dundee Ranch in 2004. It is also marketed as Seneca Ranch Second Chance Youth Ranch.

Controversy
During its operation, Dundee Ranch was the subject of multiple allegations of abuse. Parents and enrollees claimed that food being withheld as punishment. Former students complained of emotional scars due to their stay there.

A judgment in Louisiana caused Costa Rican authorities to investigate the facilities. A riot occurred at the facility in May 2003 leading to its closure. The Costa Rican immigration authorities found that 100 of the 193 children enrolled in the program did not have appropriate migration papers.

Due to the closure U.S. Representative George Miller asked U.S. Attorney General John Ashcroft to investigate WWASP.

Narvin Lichfield, who was the director at the time of the facility's closure, was jailed in Costa Rica for a brief period at the time of the closure. He was later tried in Costa Rica on charges of coercion, holding minors against their will, and "crimes of an international character" (violating a law based on international treaties, specifically referring to torture).

On February 21, 2007 a three-judge panel found Narvin Lichfield innocent of the charges of abuse. During the trial the prosecutor told the court that there was insufficient evidence and testimony to link Lichfield to the crimes for which he was accused. The Tico Times reported that the judges said they believed the students at Dundee had been abused, but there was no proof that Lichfield ordered the abuse. Three other Academy employees, all Jamaicans, had been wanted in connection with the same case, but they fled Costa Rica following the closure of the Academy.

Following the acquittal, Lichfield claimed in an e-mail to A.M. Costa Rica that when the school was raided, police stood by and watched youths sexually assault each other, that police held parents and staff at gunpoint and that one parent was ordered at gunpoint to hang up the phone when she attempted to phone the U.S. Embassy for help, and that police left the school in a shambles.

References

External links
International survivors action committee on Dundee Ranch
Pillars of Hope homepage
Pillars of Hope alternate homepage
Secret prisons for teens about Dundee Ranch/Pillars of Hope

Education in Costa Rica
Educational organizations based in Costa Rica
2003 disestablishments in Costa Rica
Behavior modification
World Wide Association of Specialty Programs and Schools